Kamasau is a Torricelli language of Turubu Rural LLG, East Sepik Province, Papua New Guinea.

Dialects
There are three dialects:
Ghini dialect, spoken in Wandomi, Wobu, and Yibab villages
Hagi dialect, spoken in Kenyari village
Segi dialect, spoken in Kamasau, Tring, and Wau villages

Phonology
Kamasau consonants are:

{| 
|  || t || ʧ || k || ʔ
|-
| b || d || ʤ || ɡ || 
|-
| ᵐb || ⁿd || ᶮʤ || ᵑg || 
|-
| ɸ || s ||  ||  || h
|-
| β ||  ||  || ɣ || 
|-
| m || n || ɲ || ŋ || 
|-
|  || r ||  ||  || 
|-
| w ||  || j ||  || 
|}

Kamasau vowels are:

{| 
| i ||  || u
|-
| e || ə || o
|-
| a ||  || 
|}

References

Marienberg languages
Languages of East Sepik Province